Piotr Brol (26 April 1944 – 26 June 2001) was a Polish footballer. He played in two matches for the Poland national football team from 1967 to 1969.

References

External links
 
 

1944 births
2001 deaths
Polish footballers
Poland international footballers
People from Tarnowskie Góry County
Association football goalkeepers
Polonia Bytom players
Śląsk Wrocław players